Wang Gang (born 17 February 1989 in Tianjin) is a Chinese footballer who currently plays for Beijing Guoan.

Club career
Wang Gang began his football career with the Tianjin Locomotive youth teams before being called up to the Chinese U17 team where he was part of the squad that won the 2004 AFC U-17 Championship. This was followed with inclusion in the team that participated in the 2005 FIFA U-17 World Championship.  After the tournament he would sign for Portuguese club S.L. Benfica initially for one year with the option of a further three. At Benfica he would play for their youth team before he moved to third-tier club Chaves.

Wang transferred to S.C. Beira-Mar in 2009. He played 26 games during the 2009–10 season, and was a substitute for 24 of the 26 matches he played in, which was the record in 2009-10 season. Wang went back to China to play for Shandong Luneng, but was immediately sent on loan to S.C. Covilhã of the Portuguese Segunda Liga. He returned to Shandong after playing 13 games for S.C. Covilhã, scoring one goal.

On his return to Shandong he was unable to establish himself within the team and on 4 February 2015 he transferred to third tier Portuguese club S.G. Sacavenense. After only one game he returned back to China to join top tier club Guizhou Renhe on 25 June 2015. He go on to make his debut on 27 June 2015, in a league game against Liaoning Whowin in a 2-1 defeat where he also scored his first goal for the club. Unfortunately he would be part of the team that was relegated at the end of the 2015 Chinese Super League season. He would remain loyal towards the club as they moved locations, renamed themselves Beijing Renhe and gained promotion back into the top tier at the end of the 2016 league season.

On 25 February 2019, Wang transferred to Chinese Super League side Beijing Sinobo Guoan. He would make his debut for them in a league game on 1 March 2019 against Wuhan Zall in a 1-0 victory.

International career
Wang Gang was called up to and made his first appearance for these China's national football team on 3 March 2010, in a friendly match against Portugal, however, the game was not recognised by FIFA. He made his official debut for the Chinese national team in a 1-0 loss against Thailand in the 2019 China Cup.

Career statistics

Club statistics
Statistics accurate as of match played 31 January 2023.

International statistics

Honours

Club
Beira-Mar
 Liga de Honra: 2009–10

Shandong Luneng Taishan
Chinese FA Cup: 2014

International
China U-17
 AFC U-17 Championship: 2004

References

External links
 Official Instagram Of Wang Gang

 
G.D. Chaves profile 

1989 births
Living people
Chinese footballers
Footballers from Tianjin
China international footballers
Chinese expatriate footballers
G.D. Chaves players
S.C. Beira-Mar players
Shandong Taishan F.C. players
Beijing Renhe F.C. players
Beijing Guoan F.C. players
Chinese Super League players
China League One players
Primeira Liga players
Campeonato de Portugal (league) players
Expatriate footballers in Portugal
Chinese expatriate sportspeople in Portugal
Association football forwards
Association football wingers
Association football fullbacks